Kollel Gur Aryeh is a kollel for young married Orthodox men located in Brooklyn, New York. It was established in 1956 by Rabbi Yitzchak Hutner as the post-graduate division of the Yeshiva Rabbi Chaim Berlin. A number of Haredi scholars and rosh yeshivas are among its alumni. The kollel is named in honor of Rabbi Judah Loew ben Bezalel, also known as the Maharal. His work on the Pentateuch is entitled Gur Aryeh.

References

Haredi Judaism in New York (state)
Gur Aryeh
Kollelim
Educational institutions established in 1956
1956 establishments in New York City